The Chronicle of Philanthropy is a magazine that covers the nonprofit world of philanthropy. Based in Washington, DC, it is aimed at charity leaders, foundation executives, fund raisers, and other people involved in philanthropy. The Chronicle of Philanthropy publishes 12 issues a year while updating its Web site daily. It was founded in 1988 by editor Phil Semas and then managing editor Stacy Palmer.  

It was formerly owned by The Chronicle of Higher Education Inc., which also publishes The Chronicle of Higher Education, a weekly newspaper covering colleges and universities. On May 4, 2022, the publication announced plans to spin off and become an independent, nonprofit organization, and in February, 2023, it said it had received approval from the Internal Revenue Service.

Research projects
The Chronicle of Philanthropy is involved in research projects such as The Philanthropy 400, which annually ranks the nation's largest nonprofit groups based on the amount of money they raise, and The Philanthropy 50, which ranks the individuals who give the most money to nonprofit groups each year. According to a 2012 study by the Chronicle, the rich (those making over $100,000 a year) give a smaller share, averaging 4.2%, to charity than those poorer (between $50,000 - $75,000 a year), who give an average of 7.6%. In 2007, they evaluated the credibility of celebrity in charitable giving and found that often celebrity involvement isn't as effective as the broader press attention it is given.

Staff
The Chronicle of Philanthropy's editor is Stacy Palmer. The chair of its board of directors is Trabian Shorters, CEO of BMe.

See also
 Arts & Letters Daily

References

External links
 

Newspapers published in Washington, D.C.